Superior mesenteric can refer to:
 Superior mesenteric artery
 Superior mesenteric vein
 Superior mesenteric lymph nodes
 Superior mesenteric ganglion